Azor Adelaide (15 February 192225 November 1971) was a Mauritian Creole  political activist who was assassinated by gunshot along Chasteauneuf Road in the town of Curepipe, Mauritius on 25 November 1971. Although witnesses have provided detailed accounts of the murder it remains unsolved.

Trial of Sir Gaëtan Duval 
In 1989 two ex-prisoners Paul Sarah and Moorgesh Shummoogum alleged in a statement to the police that in 1971 Sir Gaetan Duval had planned and commandeered the murder of Azor Adelaide at his Grand-Gaube bungalow. They made the police statement at the police station located  outside then Prime Minister Sir Aneerood Jugnauth's residence at La Caverne, Vacoas.  Paul Sarah, Moorgesh Shummoogum, Ignace Bahloo and André Celestin had already served prison sentences for their involvement in the 1971 murder.

During the afternoon of 23 June 1989 Duval landed at Plaisance Airport in Mauritius from Madagascar and he was questioned by Superintendent of Police Reesaul of the Anti Drug and Smuggling Unit (ADSU). Assistant Commissioner of Police (ACP) Cyril Morvan was also travelling on the same flight.

Duval was escorted to Line Barracks in Port Louis where he was arrested on murder charges. He was questioned in the presence of his lawyer Kader Bhayat before being detained at the barracks of Special Mobile Force in Vacoas. The arrest led to various protests by Gaetan Duval's supporters which sometimes turned violent. They protested against the dictatorial behaviour of then PM Sir Aneerood Jugnauth. However after a lengthy trial Duval was acquitted of all murder charges.

Bibliography 
The murder of Azor Adelaide is a central theme of the 2011 book L'affaire Azor Adélaide: le plus célèbre crime politique à Maurice which was written by Mauritian author Eric Bahloo.
Earlier in 2004 Jacques Panglose published a book Le procès du Roi which details the judicial battle of politician and lawyer Sir Gaetan Duval who was accused in 1989 by his former bodyguards of plotting and ordering the murder of Azor Adelaide.

References 

1922 births
1971 deaths
People from Plaines Wilhems District
Assassinated activists
History of Mauritius
Riots and civil disorder in Mauritius
Male murder victims
People murdered in Mauritius
Deaths by firearm